Lakavica is a river in North Macedonia.

Lakavica may also refer to:
 Lakavica, Gostivar, a village in North Macedonia
 Lakavica, Štip, a village in North Macedonia